Siva Chandran (born 14 November 1983) is a Singaporean film editor who edited the Singapore feature film, My Magic.

Siva contested the 2015 Singaporean general election with the Reform Party for the Ang Mo Kio Group Representation Constituency.

Filmography
Journey – Short film (2007) Writer Director
My Magic – Feature film (2008) Editor
Sweet Tapioca Porridge – Television Movie (2009) Editor
Homeopathy in Singapore – Medical Documentary (2009) Editor
An Untold Love story – Short Film (2009) Writer/Director
 Untitled Project – (2009)
 Rusiyo Rusi – A Travel log Cum Cooking show (2009) Editor

References 

Singaporean film editors
Reform Party (Singapore) politicians
Singaporean people of Tamil descent
Singaporean people of Indian descent
1983 births
Living people